"One Big Holiday" is a song by American rock band My Morning Jacket and is featured on their 2003 album It Still Moves. It is also featured on the band's 2006 live concert CD and DVD Okonokos. It is their most well-known song, behind "I'm Amazed".

Overview

Despite a lack of radio airplay the track has achieved some notability, which could be the result of several live performances, most notably on Late Night with Conan O'Brien as well as several performances at the Bonnaroo Music Festival.  Its signature guitar riff and the lyrics, telling the story of the band being "discovered", continue to make it a staple of live performances. 

The song has made appearances on several soundtracks, most notably the 2007 film The Lookout and the 2006 film Stick It. The song also was featured in episode 6, season 4 of the Fox medical drama House.

The song is a playable track in Guitar Hero 5 and a downloadable track in Rock Band 4.

Fellow Kentucky band Fifth on the Floor covered the song on their 2013 album Ashes & Angels, produced by Grammy-winning producer/artist Shooter Jennings.

A remixed and remastered version of the song was released in 2016 in promotion of the deluxe edition of It Still Moves.

Track listing

Personnel
Jim James – vocals, guitar
Johnny Quaid – guitar
Tom Blankenship – bass
Danny Cash – keyboards
Patrick Hallahan – drums

References

External links
 One Big Holiday, a song submitted to the Creative Commons

2004 singles
2003 songs
My Morning Jacket songs
Songs written by Jim James